"Michelangelo", written by Bengt Palmers and Björn Skifs, is a Swedish song performed by Björn Skifs, reaching fifth place in Melodifestivalen 1975, the Swedish qualification competition for the Eurovision Song Contest that year. The song is about trying to call Michelangelo Buonarroti to find out how he made his nice paintings.

The song was released by Skifs on the single-disc EMI 4E 006-35180. Arranger and producer was Bengt Palmers. It was also on the LP Schiffz! (EMI 062-34990). In Sweden, the song held the number one spot on Svensktoppen for seven weeks, while it peaked at number seven on the VG-lista, the Norwegian Singles chart.

References

Melodifestivalen songs of 1975
1975 singles
EMI Records singles
Björn Skifs songs
Music based on art
1975 songs
Cultural depictions of Michelangelo
Songs written by Björn Skifs